Dark & Dirty Mile is the seventh studio album (ninth overall) by Red Dirt/Texas Country band Jason Boland & The Stragglers. It was released on May 14, 2013.  Shooter Jennings co-produced the album with the band.

The title track was a top five single on the Texas Music chart in May 2013.

Track listing
"Dark and Dirty Mile" (Jason Boland, Stoney LaRue) - 4:09
"Electric Bill" (Boland, Boland) - 3:15
"Lucky I Guess" (Boland) - 5:07
"The Only One" (Boland) - 3:58
"They Took It Away" (Randy Crouch) - 3:31
"Ludlow" (Boland) - 4:07
"Nine Times Out of Ten" (Boland) - 3:43
"Blue Diamond" (Bob Childers, Brad Piccolo) - 3:42
"Green Screen" (Boland) - 3:19
"Spend All Your Time" (Boland) - 4:59
"See You When I See You" (Boland) - 5:23

Personnel

The Stragglers

Jason Boland - vocals, guitars
Roger Ray - lead guitar, pedal steel, dobro
Grant Tracy - bass
Brad Rice - drums, harmony vocals
Nick Worley - fiddle, mandolin, harmony vocals

Additional musicians

Noah Jeffries - banjo
John Michael Whitby - piano, hammond organ
Dave Perez - accordion
John Silva - percussion
Mike Hudson - percussion
Shooter Jennings - guitar

Chart performance

References

External links

Jason Boland & The Stragglers albums
2013 albums